Lee Cha-su (also spelt Lee Cha-soo, 6 June 1957 – 9 March 2020) was a South Korean politician and social activist.

Biography
He urged the relocation of the K-2 Air Force Base used with Daegu International Airport.

He served as the chairman of the Buk District Council. Lee died in Chilgok, Buk District, Daegu at the age of 62 as a result of coronavirus disease 2019 (COVID-19) on 9 March 2020.

References

1957 births
2020 deaths
South Korean politicians
South Korean activists
Deaths from the COVID-19 pandemic in South Korea